Elliston is a census-designated place (CDP) in Montgomery County, Virginia, United States.  It lies between the city of Roanoke and the town of Christiansburg in the southwestern part of the state. The population as of the 2010 Census was 902.  It is home to a small fire department, an elementary school, two gas stations, a train stop, and several churches. Most of its residents commute to larger towns. A set of railroad tracks separates the northwestern part of the town from the rest.  US highway 11-460 further divides the town into two distinct neighborhoods, "Oldtown," which formed along the Valley Road in the 1850s, and "The Brake," a predominantly African-American area that developed after the Civil War.

Originally known as Big Spring, the town's depot was an important stopping point on the Virginia and Tennessee Railroad and later the Norfolk and Western.  In the late 1880s, investors hoped to create a large industrial and railroad center there, to be known as Carnegie City.  Instead, the railroad chose the Roanoke County town of Big Lick, later Roanoke, as the location for its main shops.

The Barnett House, Big Spring Baptist Church, Pompey Callaway House, Fotheringay, and Madison Farm Historic and Archeological District are listed on the National Register of Historic Places in 1989.

References

 
Census-designated places in Montgomery County, Virginia
U.S. Route 11